Brian Walsh (born 28 September 1972) is a former Irish Fine Gael politician who served as a Teachta Dála (TD) for the Galway West constituency from 2011 to 2016. He also served as Mayor of Galway from 2006 to 2007.

He sat for a time as an Independent TD, having lost the Fine Gael parliamentary party whip, from July 2013 to April 2014.

Local politics
He was elected to Galway City Council in 2004 and re-elected in 2009. He was the Mayor of Galway from 2005 to 2006 and was the city's youngest ever mayor.

Redevelopment work on Eyre Square in Galway began in 2004. There was controversy when the building contractors, Samuel Kingston Construction, left the site and did not return. Some businesses were affected by the abandoned building site which had become an embarrassment to the city. On becoming Mayor of Galway, Walsh set up a task force to take charge of the project, and he led the effort to complete the works. The square re-opened on 13 April 2006.

2011 general election
In December 2010, Walsh was selected by Fine Gael to contest the next general election in Galway West. The then Fine Gael deputy Pádraic McCormack subsequently announced his retirement after not being selected at the party convention. Senator Fidelma Healy Eames was also selected by the party to contest the election. Councillors Seán Kyne and Hildegarde Naughton were subsequently added to the ticket as the party adopted an offensive electoral strategy in the constituency.

Expulsion from parliamentary party
Walsh was expelled from the Fine Gael parliamentary party on 2 July 2013, when he defied the party whip by voting against the Protection of Life During Pregnancy Bill 2013. He was re-admitted to the parliamentary party on 30 April 2014.

He did not contest the 2016 general election. He resigned as a TD on 14 January 2016, due to health concerns.

Controversies since resignation
On 28 February 2016, The Irish Sunday Times ran an article stating that Walsh has applied for a medical pension to the Oireachtas Pension Scheme on 16 December 2015, weeks prior to his resignation the following month. The Irish Sunday Times stated that the pension was requested on "grounds of ill health" and could be worth €500,000 if granted.

On 6 March 2016, The Irish Sunday Times ran an article stating that Walsh had directly lobbied NAMA in respect of the sale of lands by NAMA which were subsequently sold to a business partner of Brian Walsh.

On 13 March 2016, The Irish Sunday Times ran an article stating that Walsh had lobbied NAMA from 2012 to 2014 on half of a long term property developer associate who owned a Hotel in Galway, and who owed NAMA over €100m.

On 13 March 2016, Walsh indicated to Galway Media Outlets his intention to sue the Sunday Times and that "he's absolutely confident that his good name will be vindicated". However, no such proceedings were ever taken.

References

1972 births
Living people
Fine Gael TDs
Independent TDs
Mayors of Galway
Members of the 31st Dáil
Politicians from County Galway
Alumni of Galway-Mayo Institute of Technology
Local councillors in Galway (city)